Cormot-Vauchignon is a commune in the department of Côte-d'Or, eastern France. The municipality was established on 1 January 2017 by merger of the former communes of Cormot-le-Grand (the seat) and Vauchignon.

See also 
Communes of the Côte-d'Or department

References 

Communes of Côte-d'Or
Populated places established in 2017
2017 establishments in France